Shalil Kallur is an Indian film director, producer and screenwriter working in Malayalam language films. His debut directorial venture Dolls was released in 2013 and his second film Kattumakkan, a multi starrer with veterans like Mukesh, Vijay Menon and Nassar in lead roles, was released on 12 February 2016.

Career
Kallur started his career as music album director and later made Manasa Smaraami, the documentary on actor Mala Aravindan. He also directed the documentaries Reality of UAE and Gulf Script along with Tele cinemas Perunaal Raavu, Thambu, Meghangal and Theeram  while helming successful television shows Mahabalithamburan Varunnae and Mayaviyude Albuthalokam on Jeevan TV before turning the director with Dolls.

Kallur, the managing director of production house MJS Media, said that he is happy with his first outing Dolls even though it was a commercial failure, mentioning it as a perfect movie in all aspects for a debutant director.

Kallur has now completed Salmon 3D, made in seven Indian regional languages starring playback singer Vijay Yesudas in the lead role.

Filmography

References

External links
 

Living people
People from Thrissur district
Malayalam film directors
Malayalam screenwriters
Film directors from Thrissur
Year of birth missing (living people)